Moaning is an American, Los Angeles-based alternative rock band, formed by musicians Sean Solomon, Pascal Stevenson and Andrew MacKelvie in 2014. After self-releasing a self-titled EP, the band was signed to Sub Pop Records and has subsequently released two full-length albums.

History 
Stevenson and Solomon met as classmates at Taft High School and soon formed the band Moses Campbell, which began performing at local venues in the Los Angeles area, particularly and most notably the Smell. MacKelvie joined the band after a series of chance meetings at various local venues. After the break-up of Moses Campbell and another mutual band Heller Keller, Solomon wrote the songs "Don't Go" and "Misheard" and shared them with Stevenson and MacKelvie, and the three began writing and rehearsing together under the name Moaning.

The band's first release, a self-titled EP, was self-released in 2014 and contained the songs "The Same" and "Misheard." The band released a video for "The Same" that caught the attention of Alex Newport, who subsequently offered to produce the band's debut LP. The first album was recorded by the beginning of 2017 and the band sent it to various labels. Sub Pop offered to sign them after a label representative saw them perform at that year's edition of South by Southwest.

The band's first, self-titled LP was released in March 2018 to mostly positive reviews. An average of various reviews on Metacritic gave the album a score of 68 out of 100.  The highest assigned score was 80 out of 100, a score assigned to multiple reviews. One such review from Exclaim stated that "Their first offering accomplishes what it sets out to in a way post-punk fans fearing stagnation will appreciate. As old favourites veer off in new directions or the intensity of their output fades, young newcomers like Moaning are a welcome addition to the genre." The lowest-assigned score was 60, which also came from multiple sources, including Mojo, which stated that "the various '82-91 moves become too familiar and the mood of despond[ence] too oppressive."

Having started writing for a second album before the release of their debut, the band recorded their second full-length record with producer Newport after a US and European tour through the first half of 2018 with METZ and Preoccupations. Songwriting was heavily impacted by Solomon's sobriety since the release of the first album, with the singer and guitarist stating that it made him more efficient and that there was a clear distinction between songs written before and after his stopping use of alcohol and marijuana.

In January 2020, the band released the first song from the upcoming album titled "Ego," with an accompanying video. The album, titled Uneasy Laughter, was released in March 2020 to overall positive reviews, receiving an average score of 70 on Metacritic. Most reviewers regarded the record as representing an evolution in the band towards a new wave-influenced sound. Uncut praised the album as "A more mature expression of self-understanding." The Irish Times gave the album a score of four stars out of five, with the reviewer remarking "Sean Solomon, Pascal Stevenson and Andrew MacKelvie’s perfect shorthand is born of a decade of collaboration, with Solomon’s doleful voice conveying a leavening quality, an interesting seriousness amid the playfulness." Meanwhile, a review from Paste was less favorable regarding the integration of new wave influences, stating "It’d be much better if the band actually managed to define themselves without leaning on ’80s nostalgia."

Members 

 Sean Solomon - vocals, guitar (2014-present)
 Pascal Stevenson - bass, synthesizers (2014-present)
 Andrew MacKelvie - drums, percussion (2014-present)

Discography

Studio albums 

 Moaning (2018)
 Uneasy Laughter (2020)

EP 

 Moaning (2014)

References 

Musical groups from Los Angeles
Musical groups established in 2014
2014 establishments in California
American post-punk music groups
Sub Pop artists
Rock music groups from California